Julsennosi  is a mountain in the municipality of Hol in Viken, Norway.

Hol
Mountains of Viken